
The Avia BH-10 was a single-seat aerobatic sports plane built in Czechoslovakia in 1924, based on the Avia BH-9, which was in turn developed from the BH-5 and BH-1. It was easily visually distinguished from the BH-9 by the tall anti-roll pylon added behind the open cockpit in order to protect the pilot in the event that the aircraft flipped over or crashed while inverted. 21 copies of the aircraft were built, 10 of which were bought by the Czechoslovakian Army as a training aircraft and operated under the designation B.10.

Specifications

See also

References

 
 
 Němeček, V. (1968). Československá letadla. Praha: Naše Vojsko.

1920s Czechoslovakian sport aircraft
BH-10
Low-wing aircraft
Single-engined tractor aircraft
Aircraft first flown in 1924